YSTV (formerly Sports 11) is a sports television channel owned and broadcast by the Mauritius Broadcasting Corporation. It broadcasts sports programming, live football matches (along with its sister channel MBC 3) and live horse racing telecasts, as well as health programs.

See also
 Kids Channel (Mauritian TV channel)
 MBC 1 (Mauritian TV channel)
 MBC 2 (Mauritian TV channel)

References

Television channels in Mauritius
Mauritius Broadcasting Corporation